Manamelkudi is a coastal town in Pudukkottai district, Tamil Nadu, India. It is located in the southeast of the district, on the Palk Strait coast. State Highway 200 runs through the town, which is the headquarters and namesake of Manamelkudi taluk.

References

Villages in Pudukkottai district